Syed Muzaffar Hussain Shah is a Pakistani politician and a member of Senate of Pakistan. He was born in 1968. He is an active partisan of Pakistan Muslim League (F). He was nominated by the President to chair the session to administer the oath of newly elected senators and preside the election for chairman senate 2021.

Positions
 Senior Vice President, Pakistan Muslim League (Functional) (1980)
 Member Majlis Shoora (1980-1982)
 Minister for Industries Govt of Sindh (1983-1984)
 Speaker Provincial Assembly Sindh (1986-1988)
 Minister Law, Parliamentary Affairs, Agriculture Land Utilization, Minister Coordination, Govt of Sindh (1990-1992)
 Chief Minister Sindh (1992-1993)
 Speaker Provincial Assembly Sindh (2002-2008)
 Member Parliament (Senator: 2012 to 2018)
 Member Parliament (Senator: 2018 to 2024)

See also 
 A K Brohi

References

 

Politicians from Karachi
1945 births
2020 deaths
Pakistani senators (14th Parliament)
Sindh MPAs 1985–1988
 Pakistan Muslim League (F) politicians